Cedric Renard Hailey (born September 2, 1969), known professionally as K-Ci (formerly Little Cedric as a member of Little Cedric and the Hailey Singers), is an American singer, songwriter and member of K-Ci & JoJo and Jodeci.

Although Hailey is best known as the lead singer of  Jodeci and second-lead singer of K-Ci & JoJo, he participated on different solo projects as K-Ci, most notably his cover of Bobby Womack's "If You Think You're Lonely Now" in 1994.

Early life
Hailey was born in Charlotte, North Carolina, to Anita and Cliff Hailey both of whom were gospel singers. For a time, the Hailey family lived in Baltimore, MD where they performed gospel music. The family would later return to Charlotte when Cedric was a teen. He would eventually go on to attend Garinger High School.

Music career
Along with younger brother, Joel (known professionally as "JoJo") and his father, Hailey recorded three gospel albums as "Little Cedric and the Hailey Singers" beginning with the 1983 release I'm Alright Now by Atlanta International Records, Gospel. Though the album failed to place on any Billboard magazine charts, the next two releases, 1984's Jesus Saves and God's Blessing in 1985, both placed upon the Billboard Gospel Albums chart; the former at No. 4 and the latter at No. 22.

Cedric and Joel's gospel singing eventually connected them with the DeGrate brothers, Donald "DeVante Swing" DeGrate and Dalvin DeGrate, with whom they formed the R&B group Jodeci. As lead vocalist for the group, Hailey and Jodeci would release three multi-platinum albums between 1991 and 1995. In 1996, the group announced a hiatus from recording and releasing music. Hailey continued to record with his brother as the duo K-Ci & JoJo, releasing five albums between 1997 and 2013.

As K-Ci, his cover of Bobby Womack's "If You Think You're Lonely Now" was featured on the soundtrack to the 1994 film, Jason's Lyric. It was released as a single and peaked at number 17 on the Billboard Hot 100.

Personal life
Hailey dated fellow R&B singer and then label-mate Mary J. Blige from 1992 to 1997. Blige stated that they were engaged, but Hailey denied that they were going to get married.

The two Hailey brothers are cousins of R&B singers Fantasia Barrino, Dave Hollister, Calvin Richardson, and Stephanie Mills.

He is married to the Cassandra Hailey.

Discography

with Jodeci
Forever My Lady (1991)
Diary of a Mad Band (1993)
The Show, the After Party, the Hotel (1995)
The Past, The Present, The Future (2015)

with K-Ci & JoJo
 Love Always (1997)
 It's Real (1999)
 X (2000)
 Emotional (2002)
 My Brother's Keeper (2013)

Solo album
 My Book (2006)

References

1969 births
Living people
American contemporary R&B singers
20th-century African-American male singers
African-American Christians
Musicians from North Carolina
Songwriters from North Carolina
African-American songwriters
21st-century African-American people
American male songwriters